The 1919 Milan–San Remo was the 12th edition of the Milan–San Remo cycle race and was held on 6 April 1919. The race started in Milan and finished in San Remo. The race was won by Angelo Gremo.

General classification

References

1919
1919 in road cycling
1919 in Italian sport
April 1919 sports events